Charles Montgomery Skinner (15 March 1852 – 1907) was an American writer.

Newspaper career 

Skinner was born in Victor, New York.  His career in literature and journalism included editorship of the Brooklyn Eagle.  His study of the paper’s famed Walt Whitman appeared in the Atlantic Monthly in 1903.

Writings 

Skinner published collections of myths, legends and folklore found inside the United States and across the world.  Skinner hoped that America’s progress would transform the nation’s few legends into few but great ones – “as time goes on the figures seen against the morning twilight of our history will rise to more commanding stature.”    He hoped to combine folklore conventions with New England transcendentalism to keep alive traditions endangered by the industrial age.

Skinner’s writings were wide-ranging.  He was a playwright, authoring Villon, the Vagabond.  Skinner’s other interests included the seasons, especially as they changed inside of industrializing cities.  In order to improve the urban environment, he authored a guide to gardening and urban beautification.  He also commented on turn-of-the-century America’s turbulent economy in Workers and the Trusts and American Communes.  His other contributions to American literature included works of natural history such as With Feet to the Earth and Do-Nothing Days.

Endnotes

Bibliography 
John Bealle, “Another Look at Charles M. Skinner,” Western Folklore  53 (1994): 99-123.
Charles M. Skinner, Myths And Legends of Our Own Land (Philadelphia: J.B. Lippincott Company, 1896).
Charles M. Skinner, Nature in a City Yard (New York: The Century, 1897).
Charles M. Skinner, With Feet to the Earth (Philadelphia: J. B. Lippincott Company, 1898).
Charles M. Skinner, Do-Nothing Days (Philadelphia: J. B. Lippincott Company, 1898).
Charles M. Skinner, Myths and Legends Beyond Our Borders (Philadelphia: J. B. Lippincott Company, 1899).
Charles M. Skinner, Myths and Legends of Our New Possessions and Protectorates (Philadelphia: J. B. Lippincott Company, 1899).
Charles M. Skinner, Flowers in the Pave [sic] (Philadelphia: J. B. Lippincott Company, 1900).
Charles Skinner, Workers and the Trusts: Labor Conditions in the Great Manufacturing Centers of the United States (Brooklyn: Brooklyn Daily Eagle, 1900).
Charles Skinner, American Communes: Practical Socialism in the United States (Brooklyn: Brooklyn Daily Eagle, 1901).
Charles M. Skinner, Little Gardens: How to Beautify City Yards and Small Country Spaces (New York: D. Appleton, 1904).
Charles M. Skinner, Myths and Legends of Flowers, Trees, Fruits and Plants (Philadelphia: J. B. Lippincott Company, 1911).

External links 
 
 
 
 Brooklyn Daily Eagle Online. Brooklyn Public Library.

1852 births
1907 deaths
Brooklyn Eagle
American newspaper editors